Rick Fagel (born November 29, 1953) is a former professional tennis player from the United States.

Career
Fagel played collegiate tennis at Columbia University and won the Ivy League Championship in 1972, beating Vitas Gerulaitis in the final.

He appeared in 14 Grand Slam during his career. His best performance came at the 1977 US Open, where he reached the third round, with wins over Russell Simpson and Antonio Munoz. He was a mixed doubles quarter-finalist at the 1981 French Open, with German Eva Pfaff as his partner. En route they defeating a pairing consisting of Billie Jean King and Ilie Năstase.
 
Fagel defeated John McEnroe at the Cincinnati Grand Prix tournament in 1977. He was eliminated at the semi-final stage, by Mark Cox. The following year he made the quarter-finals of the Florence Open. In 1980 he and partner David Carter were doubles runners-up at the Sarasota Grand Prix.

Grand Prix career finals

Doubles: 1 (0–1)

Challenger titles

Singles: (1)

References

1953 births
Living people
American male tennis players
Columbia Lions men's tennis players
Tennis people from Florida